Malak Singh (born 30 December 1992) is an Indian field hockey player who plays as a forward. He hails from Sant Nagar in Sirsa district, Haryana, where he plays for the Namdhari XI hockey team. He was part of the Indian team that won the silver medal at the 2013 Men's Hockey Asia Cup in Malaysia.

Singh works with the western zone of Indian Railways and plays for the Railways hockey team in national championships. He also plays for Kalinga Lancers in the Hockey India League (HIL), having been signed up by the franchise in 2015 for 24,000. He previously played for the Punjab Warriors in HIL with a 9,000 contract signed in December 2012.

References

1992 births
Living people
People from Sirsa district
Indian male field hockey players
Field hockey players from Haryana